El Zaguan, at 545 Canyon Rd. in Santa Fe, New Mexico, is a historic complex started in 1854. It was listed on the National Register of Historic Places in 2008.

It is Territorial Revival in style.  A zaguan is a compound with a street doorway entrance usually leading back to a courtyard, which is surrounded by one-deep rooms.

This has also been known as the James L. Johnson House, and is a former residence of Margretta Stewart Dietrich, and later housed the Historic Santa Fe Foundation.

It was purchased in 1928 by Dietrich.  Changes were made under direction of Santa Fe designer Kate Chapman.

References

External links

National Register of Historic Places in Santa Fe County, New Mexico
Buildings and structures completed in 1854